Payment for order flow (PFOF) is the compensation that a stockbroker receives from a market maker in exchange for the broker routing its clients' trades to that market maker. It is a controversial practice that has been called a "kickback" by its critics. Policymakers supportive of PFOF and several people in finance who have a favorable view of the practice have defended it for helping develop new investment apps, low-cost trading, and more efficient execution.

In general, market makers like Citadel LLC, Virtu Financial, and Susquehanna International Group are willing to pay brokers for the right to fulfill small retail orders. The market maker profits from the bid-ask spread and rebates a portion of this profit to the routing broker as PFOF. Another fraction of a penny per share may be routed back to the consumer as price improvement. Brokers in the United States that accept payment for order flow include Robinhood, E-Trade, Ally Invest, Webull, TradeStation, Charles Schwab Corporation, and TD Ameritrade, while brokers that do not receive payment for order flow include Interactive Brokers (pro accounts that are charged commissions), Merrill Edge, Fidelity Investments, Vanguard, and Public.com.

In the United States, accepting PFOF is allowed only if no other exchange is quoting a better price on the National Market System. The broker must disclose to the client that it accepts PFOF. Transactions must be executed at the best execution, which could mean the best price available or the speediest execution available.

In Canada, PFOF is not allowed on Canadian listed securities, so Canadian brokers charge commissions, however, according to the current Canadian securities regulations, brokers can accept PFOF on non-Canadian listed securities. It is also banned in the United Kingdom. According to Euronext, European authorities have regulated payment for order flow, and the practice is allowed in a number of national jurisdictions across Europe.

History
PFOF dates back to at least 1984 as noted in the 1993 remarks of Richard Y. Roberts, Commissioner, U.S. Securities and Exchange Commission, entitled "Payment for Order Flow" in regards to a letter from Richard G. Ketchum, Director, Division of Market Regulation, SEC, to John E. Pinto, senior Vice President, NASD, dated October 5, 1984: "When the Commission first became aware of payment for order flow practices in the OTC market in late 1984, the Division of Market Regulation ('Division') wrote to the National Association of Securities Dealers ('NASD') to express its concerns and to request that the NASD 'consider possible measures to address any problems observed in this area.' In the ensuing years, the Commission has requested information from the NASD and the exchanges to determine the extent of payment for order flow practices.

PFOF was endorsed by Bernie Madoff, a market maker who pioneered computer-driven order fulfillment. In a 2000 interview, he described it as a way for market makers to outsource the task of finding orders to fulfill.

"No one tells a firm how they can advertise. If I want to hire salesmen to generate order flow, no one is going to object. I don’t have them. So if I want to use Fidelity's salesmen and pay part of my trading profits in the form of a rebate, why shouldn’t I be allowed to do it? It was characterized as this bribe and kickback and something sinister, which was very easy to do. But if your girlfriend goes to buy stockings at a supermarket, the racks that display those stockings are usually paid for by the company that manufactured the stockings. Order flow is an issue that attracted a lot of attention but is grossly overrated."    -Bernie Madoff

Although controversial in its own right, PFOF was not involved in Madoff's notorious Ponzi scheme, in which no stock trades were executed.

In 2014 broker-dealer Robinhood Markets introduced no-commission retail stock trades funded by payment for order flow. Other retail brokerages followed, and in 2020, PFOF received by TD Ameritrade, Charles Schwab Corporation, E-Trade, and Robinhood totaled $2.5 billion. A 2014 investigation by the United States Senate Homeland Security Permanent Subcommittee on Investigations, led by Carl Levin, conducted hearings focused on the conflicts of interest inherent in PFOF. At the hearings, an executive for TD Ameritrade said that it routes orders to wherever it can get the highest payment.

In January 2021, after the GameStop short squeeze, officials again questioned whether retail traders were getting the best possible prices on their orders. Rather than direct payment through shares, brokers sold their orders en masse to market makers that executed the trades, paving the way for short squeeze crashes and meme stock frenzies. Certain platforms, such as Public.com, announced that they would abandon (PFOF) and add Safety Labels to stocks rather than halt trading.

In January 2023, the U.S. Securities and Exchange Commission proposed new rules intended to increase competition for orders, which could affect payments for order flow. A public comment period runs through March 31, 2023.

Analysis

Conflicts of interest
Payment for order flow has been described as a conflict of interest. PFOF can cause executable orders not to get executed as they are routed to market makers that pay the highest amount. Retail traders generally have less information than institutions (adverse selection).

Lower commissions and fees, price improvement
Since retail orders have a lower chance of adverse selection for the market maker, they are more profitable for the market maker. These savings are passed on in part to the broker as PFOF, but also to the retail customer as price improvement: market makers often fill retail orders at a better price than the best price available on public exchanges. The additional revenue for brokers allows them to charge minimal or no commissions. PFOF was a key factor in elimination of most brokerage commissions in the United States.

Increase in market liquidity and competition
Several favorable views about PFOF have claimed that PFOF increases market liquidity and thus reduces the bid–ask spread. Bernard Madoff, an automated stock trading pioneer and later convicted fraudster, was a staunch supporter of PFOF and claimed that by routing orders away from the New York Stock Exchange, PFOF increased competition.

Academic research 
Research published in August 2022 by Christopher Schwarz of the University of California at Irvine, Brad Barber of the University of California, Davis and Terence Odean of the University of California, Berkeley argued that this practice does not appear to affect price execution in a detrimental way for the retail customer. According to the study, the market makers give better pricing on a particular stock than the figures quoted on stock exchanges and by doing so retail traders get slightly more per share when selling, and pay slightly less when buying.

References

External links

Financial markets
Agency law
Securities (finance)
Business models